Hydrocarbon fuel is fuel that consists mostly of hydrocarbons. It may refer to:
 Fossil fuel, derived from coal, oil, or natural gas
 Biofuel, derived from plant or animal matter
 Synthetic fuel, derived from synthesis gas
 Electrofuel, derived from carbon dioxide
 Peat, naturally occurring carbon-rich build up of vegetation

Fuels
Hydrocarbons